Swimming was contested from December 7 to December 19 at the 1998 Asian Games in Bangkok, Thailand.

Medalists

Men

Women

Medal table

References 
 XIII Sadec Online: Asian Games in Bangkok
 SWIMNEWS ONLINE: ASIAN GAMES Bangkok, Thailand - December 7 - 12, 1998 (50 M)

External links 
 13th Asian Games Bangkok 1998

 
1998 Asian Games events
1998
Asian Games
1998 Asian Games